Stamford House was a Remand and Assessment centre for youth in the borough of Hammersmith and Fulham. It was demolished and replaced by Hammersmith Academy, a secondary school.

References

Buildings and structures in the London Borough of Hammersmith and Fulham
Youth detention centers
Defunct prisons in London